Axinidris palligastrion is a species of ant in the genus Axinidris. Described by Shattuck in 1991, the species is endemic to Ghana, where they were found foraging on trees.

References

Endemic fauna of Ghana
Axinidris
Hymenoptera of Africa
Insects described in 1991